Phasmophobia is a paranormal horror game developed and published by British indie game studio Kinetic Games. It is based primarily on the popular hobby of ghost hunting. The game became available in early access through Steam for Microsoft Windows with virtual reality support in September 2020. The game received a large influx of popularity the following month due to many well-known Twitch streamers and YouTubers playing it, mainly for the Halloween season. On October 15, 2020, the game was the sixth-most popular game on Twitch.  It was the best selling game on Steam globally for several weeks in October to November 2020.

Gameplay
Phasmophobia is a horror investigation survival game played from a first-person perspective. The player works solo or in a group with up to three other players to complete a contract in which they must identify the type of ghost haunting the specified site. Players can communicate through voice chat, both locally within a short distance and globally via walkie-talkies. Phasmophobia features speech recognition allowing certain pieces of equipment and even the ghost to hear players speaking and understand key words and phrases. Completing objectives and gathering evidence provide a payout; complete as much as possible to level up, unlock maps and difficulties and earn money. 

Players create or join a lobby where preparation for the contracts is done. Phasmophobia gives players the option to customize their appearance by picking between eight different paranormal investigators to distinguish between group members. Located at two corkboards in the lobby, a contract location and difficulty is voted on between players. All equipment is purchased at a computer in the lobby and selected to be loaded into a van from which the group will operate upon arriving at the site.

Locations 
, there are twelve sites of various sizes:  small, medium and large. The small maps include four suburban-style houses, two farmhouses, a small campsite, and a restricted variant of the larger asylum map. The medium maps are a campsite, prison, and a high school, and the large map is an asylum. Potential future maps located at an apartment building, mansion and hospital have been hinted at. An October 2021 update brought a medium outside type map named Maple Lodge Campsite, the first map in the game to be primarily set outdoors.

Phasmophobia features twenty-four different ghosts, each of which behaves differently and provides unique clues. Upon arriving at the site, one of these ghost types will be randomly assigned for the mission. As players attempt to complete the contract, sanity will drain with certain events and circumstances affecting the rate at which it does so. When sanity is low enough, a ghost will begin to hunt and attempt to kill the players (assuming the "Friendly Ghost" custom difficulty setting, which disables hunts, is not enabled). During the hunting phase, all exit doors are locked so players must outrun and/or hide from the ghost until the end of the hunt. Depending on the ghost type's strengths and weaknesses, it may be able to hunt when sanity is higher or lower. 

Players will start in the Van where they will find the equipment they have selected and another corkboard, the Objective Board, listing the objectives they need to complete as well as the name of the ghost and showing all ten of their photos. It also houses the Surveillance Computer, Sanity Monitor, map of the current site, Sound Sensor Screen, and Site Activity Monitor. This set of equipment is permanently located inside the Van and is used to track the status of the players and ghost’s activity, although on Nightmare difficulty as well as with two specific Custom Difficulty settings, the Sanity Monitor and Site Activity monitor may be disabled and appear as smashed screens. Players who survive and have completed their objectives (or wish to give up) must return to the Van to leave. Players will also have a journal on hand permanently where information about the ghosts, evidence and photos can be found. Evidence and ghost identification must be marked in the Journal to receive money which can be used to purchase more equipment.

Equipment 
Basic equipment includes a spirit box, ghost writing book, photo camera, D.O.T.S. projector, EMF reader, video camera, UV flashlight, and conventional flashlight. Additional equipment types can be purchased and may be needed to complete the optional objectives and protect players. One cursed object - a haunted mirror, summoning circle, voodoo doll, music box, ouija board, or deck of tarot cards - will spawn per map and allow the player to interact with the ghost directly, though at the risk of provoking it into a hunt. 

Players must utilize the various pieces of equipment to identify the three pieces of evidence unique to the type of ghost they are dealing with, and often to complete optional objectives as well. , there are seven possible pieces of ghost evidence: EMF level 5, fingerprints, freezing temperatures, ghost orbs, ghost writing, seeing movement on the D.O.T.S. projector, and hearing the ghost speak through the spirit box.

Photo evidence 
Additional photo evidence can be taken with a Photo Camera to earn extra money and will give points according to the category and distance from which the photo was taken (which is denoted by a star rating). A photo of the ghost will net the most money, but other items that count towards photo evidence include bones, dead bodies (of teammates), fingerprints, footprints, interactions, a sink full of dirty water, used crucifixes, writing in the ghost writing book, ghost sillouette when it walks through the D.O.T.S. projector, and cursed possessions.

Ghost types 
 Phasmophobia has 24 different ghost types. Most of these ghost types are based on creatures and entities from various cultures and religions, such as the Banshee from Irish folklore, the Yokai, and Yurei from Japanese folklore, and the Jinn from Islamic folklore. Each ghost type has different abilities it can use, as well as times it can hunt.

Custom difficulty 
In September 2022 an update was released which added the custom difficulty to the game. This custom difficulty makes the player able to change certain settings to the mission. Changing the settings will result in a money and XP multiplier.

Development and release

Release
The game's Steam page was launched on March 6, 2020. An announcement trailer was released three months later, announcing additional VR support and a release date for the early access build. On September 18, 2020, the game was released in early access for $14. After the release, the game received two major updates regarding bug fixes in the following week. Dknighter, the founder and sole member of Kinetic Games at the time, stated he hoped to release the full game somewhere in 2021. However, until that happened, he kept the game's price the same. During the course of game development after the early access release, one of the main goals for the updates was to improve the ghosts' AI, making them smarter and less predictable, and consequently harder for players to deal with. Kinetic Games plans to release console versions once the game has more content.

Popularity
Although first releasing around mid-September, the game began to pick up steam around the beginning of October for Halloween. This was the game's first time becoming trending and was being played by many notable Twitch streamers and YouTubers. This was likely due to the game becoming early access around the beginning of the Halloween season, as well as being similar in popularity to its inspiration P.T. It could also be due to the start of the second wave of the COVID-19 pandemic causing many people to stay at home. With the influx of players due to the large amount of popular streamers playing the game, hackers became widespread during the later weeks of the game's release, mostly by trying to jumpscare players or spawn an infinite amount of items. One of the more concerning examples of hacking were stream snipers, who changed their player models to a more NSFW one, likely causing said streamers to receive warnings and bans for inappropriate content. The developers then began working on updates to solve the problem. 

On Twitch, the game grew exponentially and even reached the top 5 most viewed game in mid October, overtaking games such Among Us, Fortnite Battle Royale, FIFA 21, and Genshin Impact. According to online player tracker GitHyp, the game hit a peak of over 86,000 active players around October 10. The game became a Steam top-seller, and by the end of October 18, 2020, was the best selling game of that week, even beating out Fall Guys and pre-orders for Cyberpunk 2077. It was the highest selling game on Steam for three weeks in a row. Many Twitch streamers now stream Phasmophobia as their main game. The most famous streamers who stream Phasmophobia as their main game are: Insym, PsychoHypnotic, Nuzzgard, and the game's Lead Artist, cjdxn.

Reception

Phasmophobia was well-received by critics. Rich Stanton of PC Gamer called it "the best ghost game ever made", as well as declaring that it was "unlike anything else I've played", and that it "comes up with shit that'll turn you white". Cass Marshall, writing in Polygon, also gave a positive review, describing it as "a nice, cozy kind of horror and once it gets rolling, it is brilliant", while also finding that the game had numerous bugs which have since been fixed. John Wolfe, an American Horror Game reviewer also liked the game and appreciated many aspects of the game. Jeuxvideo.com described the game as being quite original and imaginative, on top of being creepy. They felt that the maps in the game were well thought out and that the level of progression was well-paced. Whilst the review criticized the game for its animations and certain redundancies, they felt that they would likely be smoothed out with constant updates before the game's release. A review by CBR described the game as "the perfect game for the Halloween season", praising it for its unique jumpscares, as well as for its sound design. The game has been compared to many other horror games of a similar nature, such as Friday the 13th: The Game and Dead by Daylight.

Awards

References

External links
 

Upcoming video games
Early access video games
Horror video games
Indie video games
Multiplayer online games
Video games about genies
Video games about ghosts
Video games developed in the United Kingdom
Virtual reality games
Windows games
Windows-only games
The Game Awards winners